The Jinlun Bridge is a bridge in Taimali Township, Taitung County, Taiwan. It is part of the South-Link Highway.

History
The bridge was opened for traffic on 15 October 2017.

Architecture
The bridge spans over a length of 3.25 km with the maximum height of 40 meters above sea level.

See also
 List of bridges in Taiwan
 Transportation in Taiwan

References

2017 establishments in Taiwan
Bridges completed in 2017
Bridges in Taitung County